Ville Airport  is an airport serving the town of Ndjolé in the Moyen-Ogooué Province of Gabon.

See also

 List of airports in Gabon
 Transport in Gabon

References

External links
Ndjolé Airport
OurAirports - Ndjolé

Airports in Gabon